The 2013 Prince Edward Island Scotties Tournament of Hearts, Prince Edward Island's women's provincial curling championship, was held from January 24 to 27 at the Charlottetown Curling Club in Charlottetown, Prince Edward Island. The winning team will represent Prince Edward Island at the 2013 Scotties Tournament of Hearts in Kingston, Ontario.

Teams
The teams are listed as follows:

Round robin standings
Final Round Robin Standings

Round robin results

Draw 1
Thursday, January 24, 2:00 pm

Draw 2
Thursday, January 24, 7:00 pm

Draw 3
Friday, January 25, 9:00 am

Draw 4
Friday, January 25, 2:00 pm

Draw 5
Saturday, January 26, 2:00 pm

Tiebreaker
Saturday, January 26, 7:15 pm

Playoffs

Semifinal
Sunday, January 27, 2:00 pm

Final
Sunday, January 27, 7:00 pm

References

External links

Prince Edward Island
Curling competitions in Charlottetown
Scotties Tournament of Hearts 
NPrince Edward Island Scotties Tournament of Hearts